Timothy Leonard Mander (born 9 August 1961) is an Australian politician and a former leading Australian rugby league referee. He is a Member of the Queensland Legislative Assembly. Mander was the Deputy Leader of the Opposition and Deputy Leader of the Liberal National Party of Queensland.

Before politics 
A Christian and bible college graduate, Mander was the CEO of Scripture Union Queensland.

Mander controlled the National Rugby League (NRL) grand final in 2004 and 2005. He refereed a total of 291 first grade games between 1992 and 2005. He was also an NRL video referee.

Honours awarded to Mander include 2005 International Referee of the Year and 2005 Queensland Father of the Year.

Politics 
Mander is the member of the Legislative Assembly of Queensland for Everton, having been elected at the 2012 Queensland state election by defeating Labor's Murray Watt (the Parliamentary Secretary to the Treasurer). Mander was appointed Assistant Minister for Sport and Racing on 3 April 2012. He was promoted to Minister of Housing and Public Works on 19 November 2012, following the resignation of Bruce Flegg.

Following poor opinion polling for LNP leader Lawrence Springborg, Mander initiated a leadership challenge against him, and former Treasurer Tim Nicholls also nominated for the position. In the first round, Mander received only 10 votes, against Nicholls' 14 and Springborg's 17, and was therefore eliminated. Nicholls eventually prevailed with 22 votes to Springborg's 19 and was sworn in as Opposition Leader on 6 May 2016.

After the LNP lost the 2017 state election, Mander was elected deputy LNP leader, under leader Deb Frecklington.

References

External links 
Mander to referee 2005 NRL grand final
Mander retires as NRL reveals new deal for refs
Tim Mander – profile

1961 births
Living people
Liberal National Party of Queensland politicians
Members of the Queensland Legislative Assembly
Australian rugby league referees
National Rugby League referees
Rugby League World Cup referees
Australian sportsperson-politicians
People from Brisbane
21st-century Australian politicians
Deputy opposition leaders